Shur Ab (also Romanized as Shūr Āb and Shūrāb; also known as Sarāb and Shirou) is a village in Saidabad Rural District, in the Central District of Ijrud County, Zanjan Province, Iran. At the 2006 census, its population was 81, in 33 families.

References 

Populated places in Ijrud County